Synaptocochlea belmonti is a species of sea snail, a marine gastropod mollusk in the family Trochidae, the top snails.

Distribution
This marine species occurs off Brazil.

References

Further reading
 L.R. Simone, New Gastropods from the São Pedro e São Paulo Archipelago, Brazil (Vetigastropoda and Caenogastropoda); Strombus, 2009

External links
 

 belmonti
Gastropods described in 2009